Chandpara railway station is part of the Kolkata Suburban Railway system and is under the jurisdiction of Eastern Railway. It is located on the Sealdah–Bongaon line in North 24 Parganas district in West Bengal, India.Distance between Sealdah railway station to chandpara station .

Station

Station layout

Layout

See also

References

External links 

 Chandpara Station Map

Railway stations in North 24 Parganas district
Kolkata Suburban Railway stations